Hix McCanless was an architect, surveyor, and civil engineer of Ennis, Texas.

A number of his works are listed on the National Register of Historic Places.

Works include:
Knights of Pythias building, built 1910, no longer standing
Matthews-Atwood House, 307 N. Sherman, Ennis, TX, NRHP-listed
Matthews-Templeton House, 606 W. Denton, Ennis, TX, NRHP-listed 
McCanless-Williams House, 402 W. Tyler, Ennis, TX, which McCanless built for himself, NRHP-listed
Meredith-McDowal House, 701 N. Gaines, Ennis, TX, NRHP-listed
Telfair House, 209 N. Preston, Ennis, TX, NRHP-listed

References

Architects from Texas
People from Ennis, Texas